Angus Curtis (born 26 March 1998) is an Irish rugby union player, currently playing for United Rugby Championship and European Rugby Champions Cup side Ulster. He plays as a fly-half or centre.

Born in Harare, Zimbabwe, Curtis' father is David Curtis, who won 13 caps for Ireland between 1991 and 1992, including several at the 1991 Rugby World Cup, before returning to Zimbabwe, where he currently runs the Stables Winery. Curtis' grandfather, Arthur Bryan, also won 3 caps for Ireland in 1950. Curtis first began playing rugby while at primary school in Zimbabwe, before earning a scholarship to play cricket and rugby for Hilton College in South Africa when he was 13, and only decided to focus on rugby in his final year at school, having become involved with the Sharks under-18's side.

He moved to Ireland in January 2017, joining the Ulster Academy and studying for a degree in economics with finance at Queens University Belfast. He was selected for Ireland in the 2018 Six Nations Under 20s Championship, playing at inside centre. He made his senior debut for Ulster in their 36–15 win against Scottish side Glasgow Warriors in round 17 of the 2017–18 Pro14 on 21 April 2018. He signed a development contract to join the senior squad for the 2018–19 season, which was upgraded to a full senior contract in June 2019.

Since then he has struggled with injuries. He missed much of the 2018–19 season with a number of injuries, returning to action during the early part of the 2019–20 season, before sustaining an anterior cruciate ligament injury in December 2019 which kept him out for over sixteen months. He returned to action during the Pro14 Rainbow Cup in 2021. He made his first Champions Cup start against Clermont in January 2022.

References

External links
Ulster Rugby profile
United Rugby Championship profile

1998 births
Living people
Sportspeople from Harare
Irish rugby union players
Ulster Rugby players
Rugby union centres
Rugby union fly-halves
Alumni of Hilton College (South Africa)